Abhishek Bachchan is an Indian actor and producer known for his work in Hindi films. He made his debut in 2000, opposite Kareena Kapoor, in the J. P. Dutta-directed war drama Refugee. His portrayal of the titular unnamed refugee garnered him a nomination for Best Male Debut at the Filmfare Awards ceremony. However, the film was a box office failure, as were a series of his subsequent films, including Bas Itna Sa Khwaab Hai (2001), and Shararat (2002). His career prospects improved in 2004, when he played a gangster in the Mani Ratnam-directed political drama Yuva, and a police officer in Sanjay Gadhvi's action thriller Dhoom. For the former, he won his first Filmfare Award for Best Supporting Actor, and the latter became one of the highest-grossing films of the year and his first commercial success.

In 2005, Bachchan starred in the crime comedy Bunty Aur Babli opposite Rani Mukerji, and the Ram Gopal Varma-directed thriller Sarkar. The former was the second highest-grossing film of the year, and his performance in the latter earned him a second Filmfare Award for Best Supporting Actor. In both films he co-starred with his father, Amitabh Bachchan. That same year, he also appeared in the Bengali film Antarmahal (2005). The following year, Bachchan appeared in the Karan Johar-directed musical romantic drama Kabhi Alvida Naa Kehna (2006), for which he received his third consecutive Filmfare Award for Best Supporting Actor. The same year, he reunited with Dutta on the historical romance Umrao Jaan (2006), and reprised his role as a police officer in the second installment of the Dhoom series, entitled Dhoom 2 (2006). The latter was the highest grossing Bollywood film to that point. Bachchan next starred alongside Aishwarya Rai in Guru (2007), a biopic inspired by the life of the businessman Dhirubhai Ambani. His titular role in the film was positively received.

In 2008, Bachchan starred in Varma's Sarkar Raj, the romantic comedy Dostana, and the superhero film Drona. The following year, Bachchan produced and appeared in Paa (2009), a comedy-drama which won the National Film Award for Best Feature Film in Hindi. In the same year, he also starred in the Rakeysh Omprakash Mehra-directed satire Delhi-6 (2009). Bachchan then suffered a brief setback in his career as he starred in another series of films that performed poorly at the box-office, including Ratnam's drama Raavan (2010), and the action thriller Game (2011). His role in the comedy Bol Bachchan (2012), opposite Ajay Devgan, proved to be his first box-office success since Paa. He followed this with three commercially successful films: Dhoom 3 (2013), opposite Aamir Khan, the action heist comedy Happy New Year (2014), opposite Shah Rukh Khan, and the 2016 film Housefull 3. Abhishek Bachchan starred in Manmarziyaan in 2018, an Indian romantic drama directed by Anurag Kashyap.

He was seen in Red Chillies Entertainment production Bob Biswas, that went on floors and was released on 3 December 2021.

Filmography

Actor

Producer

Television

Music video

See also 
 List of awards and nominations received by Abhishek Bachchan

References

External links 
 
 Abhishek Bachchan on Bollywood Hungama

 Indian filmographies
 Male actor filmographies